The Greatest is the seventh studio album by Cat Power, the stage name and eponymous band of American singer-songwriter Chan Marshall. All tracks on the album were written by Marshall, making it her first album not to include any cover songs. The Memphis Rhythm Band includes Roy Brewer, Teenie Hodges, Steve Potts, Dave Smith, Rick Steff, Doug Easley, Jim Spake, Scott Thompson and Susan Marshall. String arrangements were contributed by Harlan T. Bobo and Jonathan Kirkscey.

The Greatest debuted at #34 on the Billboard 200, her highest charting album at the time. It also won the 2006 Shortlist Music Prize, making Marshall the first woman to win the honor.  It was also named the 6th best album of 2006 by Rolling Stone, as well as the 26th best album of the decade.

Critical reception

The Greatest has received a very positive response since its release. At Metacritic, which assigns a normalized rating out of 100 to reviews from mainstream critics, the album received an average score of 80, based on 35 reviews, which indicates "generally favorable reviews".

Rhapsody ranked the album #6 on its "Alt/Indie’s Best Albums of the Decade" list. "The mercurial Chan Marshall returned to her Southern roots and recorded this blissful album in Memphis. The Greatest glows with a new ease, and the music itself -- which features many of the greatest soul musicians in history -- is sunny and open. There's a sense of joy coming through here that you'll want to share with friends."

Track listing

Personnel
Chan Marshall – vocals, piano, guitar
Mabon "Teenie" Hodges – guitar on all songs except "Hate"
Leroy Hodges – bass (on tracks: 1, 3, 8, 12)
David Smith – bass (on tracks: 2, 4-6, 9, 10)
Steve Potts – drums
Doug Easley – guitar, pedal steel
Rich Steff – keyboards, clavitone, piano, organ
Jim Spake – saxophone
Scott Thompson – trumpet
Roy Brewer – violin
Johnathan Kirkscey – cello
Beth Luscone – viola

Chart positions
The album debuted at number 34 on the U.S. Billboard 200 chart, selling about 23,000 copies in its first week. As of 2009, the album has tallied 125,000 copies in the United States alone, according to Nielsen SoundScan. It was awarded a gold certification from the Independent Music Companies Association, which indicated sales of at least 100,000 copies throughout Europe.

Sales

</ref>}

References

Cat Power albums
2006 albums
Matador Records albums
Contemporary R&B albums by American artists
Soul albums by American artists